Ilyok-Koshary is a rural locality (a selo) and the administrative center of Ilyok-Kosharskoye Rural Settlement, Rakityansky District, Belgorod Oblast, Russia. The population was 683 as of 2010. There are 7 streets.

Geography 
Ilyok-Koshary is located 20 km northwest of Rakitnoye (the district's administrative centre) by road. Barilov is the nearest rural locality.

References 

Rural localities in Rakityansky District